The Enyon Baronetcy, of Flowrie in the County of Northampton, was a title in the Baronetage of England. It was created on 9 April 1642 for James Enyon, a Royalist soldier. He was killed in a duel with Sir Nicholas Crispe, Bt, at Royalist army headquarters in Gloucestershire already the same year. Enyon had no sons and the title died with him.

Enyon baronets, of Flowrie (1642)
Sir James Enyon, 1st Baronet (c. 1587–1642)

References

Extinct baronetcies in the Baronetage of England